A Bluebird in My Heart is a 2018 Belgian-French thriller drama film written and directed by Jérémie Guez and starring Roland Møller, Veerle Baetens, Lola Le Lann and Lubna Azabal.  It is based on the novel The Dishwasher by Dannie M. Martin.  It is also Guez's feature directorial debut.

Synopsis
Attempting to lead a quiet reformed life, an ex-con (Møller) finds refuge in a motel run by a single mother (Baetens) and her daughter Clara (Le Lann). The peace and freedom he has found in this safe haven disappears when Clara is assaulted, forcing him to face his old demons.

Cast
Roland Møller - Danny
Veerle Baetens - Laurence
Lola Le Lann - Clara
Lubna Azabal - Nadia

Release
The film premiered at the South by Southwest Film Festival in March 2018.  That same month, Shudder acquired U.S., Canada and UK/Ireland distribution rights to the film.  The film was released in the United States via Shudder on November 14, 2019.

Reception
The film has  rating on Rotten Tomatoes.  Paul Parcellin of Film Threat gave the film an 8 out of 10.

Jordan Mintzer of The Hollywood Reporter gave the film a positive review, calling it "A predictable film noir bouyed  by its cast and atmosphere."

References

External links
 
 

2010s French-language films
Belgian thriller drama films
French thriller drama films
2018 thriller drama films
2018 thriller films
2018 drama films
Films based on American novels
2010s English-language films
2018 multilingual films
Belgian multilingual films
French multilingual films
2010s French films